Rains may refer to:

Surname
Rains (surname)

Places
 Rains, South Carolina, an unincorporated community in Marion County, South Carolina
 Rains County, Texas, a county in East Texas

Entertainment
 The Rains, a 2016 zombie novel by Gregg Hurwitz
 The Rains (EP), 2002, by Some Girls
 Rains (band), an American rock band formed in 2000

See also
Rain (disambiguation)